Combining Diacritical Marks Extended is a Unicode block containing diacritical marks used in German dialectology (Teuthonista).

History
The following Unicode-related documents record the purpose and process of defining specific characters in the Combining Diacritical Marks Extended block:

References 

Unicode blocks